Batman Dam is one of the 22 dams of the Southeastern Anatolia Project of Turkey, built on the Batman River, north of Batman, in southeastern of Turkey. It was constructed between 1986 and 1999. There is a hydroelectric power plant, established in 1998, at the dam, with a power output of 191.7 MW. The Silvan Dam is located upstream.

References

 
 www.un.org.tr/undp/Gap.htm - United Nations  Southeast Anatolia Sustainable Human Development Program (GAP) 
 www.gapturkiye.gen.tr/english/current.html Current status of GAP as of June 2000 
www.ecgd.gov.uk Data sheet

External links

 www.gap.gov.tr - Official GAP web site

Hydroelectric power stations in Turkey
Southeastern Anatolia Project
Dams in Batman Province
Dams completed in 1999
Dams on the Batman River
1999 establishments in Turkey